Mariz may refer to:

 Mariz (parish), now Creixomil e Mariz, in Barcelos, Portugal
 A parish in Guitiriz, Lugo, Galicia, Spain
 A parish in Chantada, Lugo, Galicia, Spain
 Mariz (river), a river of Galicia

People
 Mariz (surname), Portuguese and Brazilian surname
 Mariz (name), list of people with the name

See also
 Brazilian ship Mariz e Barros